Matthew Colin Taibbi (born March 2, 1970) is an American author, journalist, and podcaster. He has reported on finance, media, politics, and sports. A former contributing editor for Rolling Stone, he is an author of several books, co-host of Useful Idiots, and publisher of the newsletter Racket News (formerly TK News) on Substack.

Taibbi began as a freelance reporter working in the former Soviet Union, including a period in Uzbekistan, from where he was deported for criticizing President Islam Karimov. Taibbi later worked as a sports journalist for the English-language newspaper The Moscow Times. He also played professional baseball in Uzbekistan and Russia as well as professional basketball in Mongolia. In 1997, he moved back to Russia to edit the tabloid Living Here, but eventually left to co-edit rival tabloid The eXile. Taibbi returned to the United States in 2002 and founded the Buffalo-based newspaper The Beast. He left a year later to work as a columnist for the New York Press.

In 2004, Taibbi began covering politics for Rolling Stone. In 2008, Taibbi won a National Magazine Award for three columns he wrote for Rolling Stone. Taibbi became known for his brazen style, having branded Goldman Sachs a "vampire squid" in a 2009 article. His work often has drawn comparisons to the gonzo journalism of writer Hunter S. Thompson, who also covered politics for Rolling Stone. In 2019, he launched the podcast Useful Idiots, co-hosted by Katie Halper. In 2020, he began self-publishing his online writing on Substack. In recent years, Taibbi's writing has focused on culture war issues and cancel culture. He has criticized mainstream media including its coverage of Russian interference in the 2016 United States elections. In 2022–23, Taibbi released several installments of the Twitter Files.

Taibbi has authored several books, including The Great Derangement (2009); Griftopia (2010); The Divide (2014); Insane Clown President (2017); I Can't Breathe (2017); and Hate Inc. (2019).

Early life and education 
Matt Taibbi was born in 1970 in New Brunswick, New Jersey. Taibbi's father, Mike Taibbi, is an NBC television reporter of mixed Filipino and Native Hawaiian descent who was adopted by an Italian-American couple. According to Taibbi, his surname is a Sicilian name of Lebanese origin; however, he is of neither Sicilian nor Lebanese descent because his father was adopted. He has also claimed Irish descent through his mother.

Taibbi grew up in the Boston suburbs. His parents separated when he was young and he was largely raised by his mother. Because Taibbi was troubled with behavioral and academic problems, his parents sent him to Concord Academy. He first attended New York University but was "unable to deal with being just one of thousands of faces in a city of millions" and transferred after his freshman year to Bard College, where he graduated in 1992. He spent a year abroad studying at Leningrad Polytechnic University, where he finished his credits for graduation from Bard.

Career

Uzbekistan 
In the early 1990s, Taibbi moved from Saint Petersburg to Tashkent, Uzbekistan, where he began selling news articles more regularly. He was deported in 1992 for writing an article for the Associated Press that was critical of President Islam Karimov. At the time of his deportation, Taibbi was the starting left fielder for the Uzbek national baseball team.

Mongolia 
Taibbi moved to Ulaanbaatar, Mongolia for a time in the '90s, where he played professional basketball in the Mongolian Basketball Association (MBA), which, he says, is the only basketball league outside the United States that uses the same rules as the US NBA. Taibbi became known as "The Mongolian Rodman", was paid $100/month to play, and says he also hosted a radio show while there. He later contracted pneumonia and returned to Boston for surgery.

Russia
Taibbi moved to Russia in 1992. He lived and worked in Russia and the former USSR for more than six years. He joined Mark Ames in 1997 to co-edit the English-language Moscow-based, bi-weekly free newspaper, The eXile, which was written primarily for the city's expatriate community. The eXiles tone and content were highly controversial. For example, a regular column reported on a member of staff at The eXile hiring a Russian prostitute and then writing a long "review" of the woman and the details of the sexual encounter. Its content was considered either brutally honest and gleefully tasteless or juvenile, misogynistic, and even cruel. In the US media during this time, Playboy magazine published pieces on Russia by Taibbi or by Taibbi and Ames. Taibbi's first book, The Exile: Sex, Drugs, and Libel in the New Russia, co-authored with Ames, was published in 2000. A film based on the book was under development by producers Ted Hope and James Schamus of Good Machine but did not materialize. He later stated that he was addicted to heroin while he did this early writing.

In 2017, Taibbi was criticized for excerpts from a chapter in the book written by Ames that described sexual harassment of employees at The eXile. In a Facebook post responding to the controversy, Taibbi apologized for the "cruel and misogynistic language" used in the book, but said the work was conceived as a satire of the "reprehensible" behavior of American expatriates in Russia and that the description of events in the chapter was "fictional and not true". Although the book includes a note saying that it is a work of non-fiction, emails obtained by Paste in 2017 include a representative of the publisher, Grove Press, saying the "statement on the copyright page is incorrect. This book combines exaggerated, invented satire and nonfiction reporting and was categorized as nonfiction because there is no category for a book that is both." Two women portrayed in the book told Paste magazine that none of the sexual harassment portrayed in the book "[ever] happened" and that it was a "ridiculous passage written by Mark".

United States
In 2002, he returned to the United States to start the satirical bi-weekly The Beast in Buffalo, New York. He left that publication a year later, commenting: "Running a business and writing is too much." Taibbi continued as a freelancer for The Nation, Playboy, New York Press (where he wrote a regular political column for more than two years), Rolling Stone, and New York Sports Express (as editor-at-large).

In 2004, Taibbi began covering politics for Rolling Stone. A contributing editor, he wrote feature-length articles on domestic and international affairs. He also wrote a weekly political online column, "The Low Post", for the magazine's website.

In March 2005, Taibbi's satirical essay, "The 52 Funniest Things About the Upcoming Death of the Pope", published in the New York Press, was denounced by Hillary Clinton, Michael Bloomberg, Matt Drudge, Abe Foxman, and Anthony Weiner. He left the paper in August 2005, shortly after his editor Jeff Koyen was forced out over the article. Taibbi defended the piece as "off-the-cuff burlesque of truly tasteless jokes," written to give his readers a break from a long run of his "fulminating political essays". Taibbi also said he was surprised at the vehement reactions to what he wrote "in the waning hours of a Vicodin haze".

Taibbi covered the 2008 United States presidential election in Year of the Rat, a special Rolling Stone diary. In February 2008, Taibbi contributed a three-minute segment to Real Time with Bill Maher in which he interviewed residents of Youngstown, Ohio before the Ohio primary. He was invited as a guest on MSNBC's The Rachel Maddow Show and other MSNBC programs. He has also appeared on Democracy Now! and Chapo Trap House, and served as a contributor on Countdown with Keith Olbermann. Taibbi has appeared on the Thom Hartmann radio and television shows, and the Imus in the Morning Show on the Fox Business network.

Journalist James Verini said that while interviewing Taibbi in a Manhattan restaurant for Vanity Fair, Taibbi cursed and threw his coffee mug at him, and followed him outside and halfway around the block as he tried to get away, saying "I still haven't decided what I'm going to do with you!", all in response to Verini saying that Taibbi's book, The Exile: Sex, Drugs, and Libel in the New Russia, was "redundant and discursive". The interview took place in 2010, and Taibbi later described the incident as "an aberration from how I've behaved in the last six or seven years".

After conservative commentator Andrew Breitbart died in March 2012, Taibbi wrote an obituary in Rolling Stone, entitled "Andrew Breitbart: Death of a Douche". Many conservatives were angered by the obituary, in which Taibbi wrote: "Good! Fuck him. I couldn't be happier that he's dead." He claimed that it was "at least half an homage", claiming respect for aspects of Breitbart's style, but also alluding to Breitbart's own derisive obituary of Ted Kennedy.

In 2018, Taibbi began publishing a novel, The Business Secrets of Drug Dealing: Adventures of the Unidentified Black Male, as a serialized subscription via email and a website with an anonymous partner. The novel is fictional with true-crime elements.

Since the mid-2010s, Taibbi's reporting has increasingly focused on culture war topics and cancel culture. He has also criticized mainstream media and their coverage of Donald Trump and Russian interference in the 2016 United States elections. His writing has since polarized readers and fellow journalists. Ross Barkan wrote, "Taibbi's critics view him as a reporter turned red-pilled culture warrior chasing subscriptions — or worse, a middle-aged male no longer at the vanguard, aggrieved that younger journalists are now leading the fight for justice." Barkan continued, "The liberal-left especially loathes the way Taibbi equates the right- and left-wing media."

In 2019, Taibbi self-published the book Hate Inc., a critique of the mainstream media landscape. Taibbi argues that both sides of the political media spectrum are complicit in dividing the country and fueling hate. The book includes a chapter, "Why Russiagate Is This Generation's WMD", comparing Russiagate to 2002–2003 allegations that Iraq had access to weapons of mass destruction, which were used by George W. Bush's administration as the most prominent rationale for the Iraq War. Reviewing the book for Paste, Jason Rhode called it a "brilliant indictment of American media", praising the majority of the book but criticized Taibbi for "[spending] a section of his book both-sidesing both MSNBC and FOX".

In October 2019, Taibbi argued that the whistleblower in the Trump–Ukraine scandal was not a "real whistleblower" because the whistleblower would have had their life affected by prosecution or being sent to prison. Taibbi also quoted former CIA analyst Robert Baer who argued that the whistleblower was part of a "palace coup against Trump."

Taibbi won the Munk Debates on November 22, 2022: "Be it resolved, don´t trust Mainstream Media."

Financial journalism
In his reporting in the wake of the 2008 subprime mortgage crisis and subsequent Great Recession, Taibbi described Goldman Sachs as "a great vampire squid wrapped around the face of humanity, relentlessly jamming its blood funnel into anything that smells like money". In financial and political media the expression "Vampire Squids" has come to represent the perception of the financial and investment sector as entities that "sabotage production" and "sink the economy as they suck the life out of it in the form of rent." Tackling the assistance to banks given in foreclosure courts, Taibbi traveled to Jacksonville, Florida to observe the "rocket docket". He was brought in to observe a hearing with attorney April Charney. He concluded that it processed foreclosures without regard to the legality of the financial instruments being ruled upon, and sped up the process to enable quick resale of the properties, while obscuring the fraudulent and predatory nature of the loans.

In February 2014, Taibbi joined First Look Media to head a financial and political corruption-focused publication, Racket. However, after management disputes with First Look's leadership delayed its launch and led to its cancellation, Taibbi returned to Rolling Stone the following October.

Sports journalism 
Taibbi wrote a column, "The Sports Blotter", for the free weekly newspaper, The Boston Phoenix. He covered legal troubles involving professional and amateur athletes.

Useful Idiots
In August 2019, Taibbi launched a political podcast, Useful Idiots, co-hosted with Katie Halper and released through Rolling Stone. The podcast has since featured interviews with various guests including Liz Franczak, Andre Damon, David Dayen, Cornel West, Glenn Greenwald, and Aaron Maté.

In March 2021, Taibbi announced that Useful Idiots would no longer be released by Rolling Stone and would be moving to Substack. With a few changes in program support staff, it is published by Substack as both audio and video that features both a free subscription and a paid subscription.

In January 2022, he announced a sabbatical leave to write a book. In his absence friend of the show Aaron Maté will fill in for him.

Racket News
In April 2020, Taibbi announced he would no longer publish his online writing through Rolling Stone, and henceforth, would publish his online writing independently through the e-mail newsletter service Substack. He stated that he would continue to contribute print features for Rolling Stone and maintain the Useful Idiots podcast with Katie Halper. (In April 2021, Useful Idiots, under its same name, but with some support staff changes, also would move to publication by Substack.) Taibbi stated that his decision to move his writing to the newsletter service was made independently and that he was not asked to leave Rolling Stone. Taibbi branded his Substack newsletter TK news, after a term used in manuscript preparation for publication and journalism, TK, that stands for "to come", indicating that more will follow. After a period of publication with free subscriptions only, Taibbi introduced an additional, paid subscription featuring content that will not be provided as part of the free subscriptions. As of October 2021, TK News had more than 30,000 paying subscribers. On January 24, 2023 the name was changed from TK News to Racket News.

On August 12, 2022, the podcast America This Week was added to TK news. It is a weekly national news wrap-up with Taibbi and Walter Kirn, novelist and literary critic, that is released on Fridays. A transcript of the podcast is also published at Racket News. It is also available on Apple Podcasts.

Twitter Files

On December 2, 2022, Taibbi began tweeting about and screenshoting emails that executives of Twitter sent each other concerning content moderation in 2020. The emails were provided to Taibbi by Twitter CEO Elon Musk and documented parts of the discussions among Twitter's communication team about how Twitter should handle a New York Post article about a laptop computer that had been owned by Hunter Biden. The documents, dubbed the "Twitter Files" and retweeted by CEO [Elon Musk], were selected from "thousands of internal documents obtained by sources at Twitter". Taibbi's report was in the form of a Twitter thread with screen shots of email exchanges between Twitter executives. Taibbi noted that "in exchange for the opportunity to cover a unique and explosive story, I had to agree to certain conditions" that he did not specify. Taibbi's presentation largely confirmed what was already known and did not contain any significant new revelations. Jeffrey Blehar, writing for National Review, said that Taibbi's reporting "contained few, if any, explosive revelations for people who have been tuned in to the debacle surrounding Twitter's suppression of the New York Post story on Hunter Biden's laptop". The Wall Street Journal editorial board wrote that the Twitter Files are "confirmation of the central role that former spies played in October 2020 in framing the Hunter Biden story in a way that made it easier for Twitter and Facebook to justify their censorship." Taibbi's thread included emails from Ro Khanna to former Twitter executive Vijaya Gadde, in which Khanna expressed concern about Twitter's decision to limit the circulation of the New York Post article about Hunter Biden. Khanna wrote that Twitter's actions violated "1st Amendment principles".

The third installment, released on December 9, 2022, by Taibbi, highlighted events within Twitter leading to Donald Trump's suspension from Twitter.

The sixth installment, released on December 16, 2022, by Taibbi, described how the FBI contacted Twitter to suggest that action be taken against several accounts for allegedly spreading election disinformation.

The ninth installment, released on December 24, 2022, by Taibbi, relates to the CIA and FBI's alleged involvement in Twitter content moderation.

The eleventh and twelfth installments, released on January 3, 2023, are by Taibbi.

The fourteenth installment, released on January 12, 2023, is by Taibbi.

The fifteenth installment, released on January 27, 2023, by Taibbi, reports on the Hamilton 68 Dashboard maintained by the Alliance for Securing Democracy.

The sixteenth installment, released on February 18, 2023, by Taibbi, reports on messages to Twitter by Maine senator Angus King and U.S. State Department security engineer Mark Lenzi expressing concern regarding Twitter accounts they deemed suspicious.

The seventeenth installment, released on March 2, 2023, by Taibbi, reports on the Global Engagement Center which was established by the Countering Foreign Propaganda and Disinformation Act.

On March 9, 2023, Taibbi appeared with Michael Shellenberger before the United States House Committee on the Judiciary Select Subcommittee on the Weaponization of the Federal Government in a hearing on the Twitter Files.

The nineteenth installment of the Twitter Files, "The Great Covid-19 Lie Machine, Stanford, the Virality Project, and the Censorship of “True Stories” raises questions about the government and social media censorship.

Personal life 
Taibbi is married to Jeanne, a family physician. They have three children.

Taibbi previously lived in Jersey City, New Jersey. As of 2021, he lives in Mountain Lakes, New Jersey.

In a 2008 interview with Hemant Mehta for Patheos, Taibbi described himself as an "atheist/agnostic".

Awards 

In 2008, Taibbi was awarded the National Magazine Award in the category "Columns and Commentary" for his Rolling Stone columns. He won a Sidney Award in 2009 for his article "The Great American Bubble Machine".
In 2020 Matt Taibbi was awarded the Izzy Award that honors the independent journalism of I.F. Stone for work outside of corporate control. The Award is given by the Park Center for Independent Media at Ithaca College. Taibbi was honored "for his exceptional stories on media bias in conservative and liberal news that culminated in his book, Hate, Inc."

Bibliography 
The eXile: Sex, Drugs, and Libel in the New Russia. Co-authored with Mark Ames, and published in 2000 with a foreword by Eduard Limonov. 
Spanking the Donkey: On the Campaign Trail with the Democrats,. A campaign diary from the 2004 US presidential election, published by New Press in 2005.
Spanking the Donkey: Dispatches from the Dumb Season,. Published by Three Rivers Press (August 22, 2006).
Smells Like Dead Elephants: Dispatches from a Rotting Empire,. Published by Grove Press, Black Cat in 2007.
The Great Derangement: A Terrifying True Story of War, Politics, and Religion at the Twilight of the American Empire,. Published by Spiegel & Grau in 2008.
Griftopia: Bubble Machines, Vampire Squids, and the Long Con That Is Breaking America,. Published by Spiegel & Grau (2010).
The Divide: American Injustice in the Age of the Wealth Gap,. Published by Spiegel & Grau (April 8, 2014).
Insane Clown President: Dispatches from the 2016 Circus,. Published by Spiegel & Grau (January 17, 2017).
I Can't Breathe: A Killing on Bay Street,. Published by Spiegel & Grau (October 24, 2017).
Hate Inc.: Why Today's Media Makes Us Despise One Another,. Published by OR Books (October 8, 2019).

References

External links

 Racket News on Substack
 
 
 In Depth interview with Taibbi, June 4, 2017, C-SPAN
 "Hearing on Twitter Documents About Content Moderation Decisions." U.S. House Judiciary Select Subcommittee on the Weaponization of the Federal Government. C-SPAN. March 9, 2023.
 
 "Matt Taibbi, "News Inside," and CPI Accept 12th Izzy Award." Park Center for Independent Media, Ithaca College,2020.

 
1970 births
Living people
American columnists
American online journalists
American male journalists
American finance and investment writers
American political writers
American media critics
American podcasters
Journalists from New Jersey
Journalists from Massachusetts
Writers from New Brunswick, New Jersey
Writers from Jersey City, New Jersey
Writers from Boston
American writers of Filipino descent
New York Press people
Rolling Stone people
The Moscow Times
20th-century American journalists
21st-century American journalists
20th-century American non-fiction writers
21st-century American non-fiction writers
20th-century American male writers
21st-century American male writers
21st-century American newspaper founders
American expatriate sportspeople in Mongolia
American expatriate sportspeople in Russia
American expatriate sportspeople in Uzbekistan
People deported from Uzbekistan
American atheists
American agnostics
New York University alumni
Bard College alumni
Concord Academy alumni
American people of Irish descent
American people of Native Hawaiian descent
People from New Brunswick, New Jersey
People from Jersey City, New Jersey
People from Mountain Lakes, New Jersey